A rave is a kind of dance party.

Rave or Raves may also refer to:

Geography
 Raves, Vosges, a commune in the Vosges département in France

Related to rave parties
Free party, an illegal rave

Computer
Rave language, a declarative modeling language used to model cost and legality in Jeppesen's Crew & Network Operation Management products

Art, entertainment, and media
 Rave (film), a 2000  American film written and directed by Ron Krauss
 Rave (magazine), an Indian music magazine
 Rave (board game)
 Rave Master, a 1999 anime and manga franchise, also known as Groove Adventure Rave
 Rave Motion Pictures, a defunct movie theater company that is now part of Cinemark since 2013
 Raves (band), a 1980s power pop group from Atlanta, Georgia, United States
 The Rave, a concert venue in Milwaukee, Wisconsin, United States
 Rave music
 Dave "Rave" Ogilvie, a Canadian record producer, mixer, songwriter, and musician

Other
 Rave (apple), also known as MN55 and First Kiss, an apple cultivar developed in Minnesota

See also
 RAVE (disambiguation)
 Raven (disambiguation)
 Raver (disambiguation)
 Raves (disambiguation)